R2Y may refer to:
Yokosuka R2Y
Consolidated R2Y